Livu Akvaparks (Līvu Akvaparks) is the largest indoor multifunctional water park in the Baltic States and one of the biggest in Eastern Europe. The water park is one of Latvia's main tourist attractions. It is located in Jūrmala by the river Lielupe  and it has over 40 attractions, including about 20 water slides, more than 10 pools of various depths and sizes and a large pool with artificial waves, water park for children, an artificial stream, spa for adults with a cocktail bar, whirlpool, saunas etc.

History 
Livu Akvapark was opened on December 30, 2003, after 2 years of construction and €16 million. Livu Akvapark includes changing rooms for both genders and families. In early 2005 construction began on an outdoor water park and in the summer of the same year it was opened to the public. With the outdoor area, Livu Akvaparks total space was expanded by 7000m2 bringing it to a total of 18000m2 making it the largest closed-type water park in Northern Europe. In spring of 2007 the construction of a slide tower in the outdoor beach was started. Later, in 2008 an outdoor water fountain was added to celebrate its 5-year anniversary. In 2012 it saw a complete reconstruction of the spa complex which added a salt chamber, 4 Jacuzzis, a Turkish sauna, oxygen bath and more. In 2014 the outdoor pool was reconstructed and many attractions added. The outdoor pool has a capacity of 700m3, which is ¼ of the whole supply of water in the aquapark.

References 

2003 establishments in Latvia
Water parks